Dehgah-e Tapi (also Romanized as Dehgāh-e Tapī) is a village in Seyyedvaliyeddin Rural District, Sardasht District, Dezful County, Khuzestan Province, Iran. At the 2006 census, its population was 127, in 27 families.

References 

Populated places in Dezful County